Lumikuuro is the first full-length album by Russian doom metal/post-rock band Kauan, released in 2007 on the BadMoodMan Music label.

Track listing
"Alku" – 02:08
"Aamu ja kaste" – 07:01
"Lumikuuro" – 07:28
"Savu" – 04:11
"Koivun elämä" – 06:27
"Syleilyn sumu" – 05:14
"Villiruusu" – 05:17
"Syleilyn sumu (acoustic)" – 05:11

Personnel
Anton Belov – guitar, vocals, keyboards, programming
Lubov Mushnikova – violin
Alexander Borovikh – guitar, backing vocals

References

2007 debut albums
Kauan albums